Hot milk cake is a butter sponge cake from American cuisine. It can be made as a sheet cake or a layer cake, or baked in a tube pan. The hot milk and butter give the cake a distinctive fine-grained texture, similar to pound cake.

Hot milk cake gets its distinctive flavor from the scalded milk that is the liquid component of the batter. It differs from traditional sponge cakes like angel food cake in that it contains baking powder as leavening instead of just egg whites, so it can be made with butter like a Victoria sponge. The eggs are beaten together whole instead of whipped as yolks and whites separately.

Preparation

Eggs are creamed with sugar, then flour is added. The milk is heated with butter until the butter has melted. This hot milk-butter mixture is poured into the batter all at once. The batter is mixed until it cools. Baking powder and vanilla flavor are added at the last stage before the cake is baked. This method gives the cake a fine-grained texture that is more similar to pound cake than traditional egg-leavened sponge cakes.

History
A simple recipe from 1911 is made with sugar, eggs, flour, salt, baking powder and hot milk, with optional ingredients of chocolate, nuts or coconut. A recipe from Ruth Ellen Church, a former food editor for the Chicago Tribune who sometimes wrote under the pen name Mary Meade was published in 1955. It has mocha-flavored icing, and is moist and delicate.

It is served every year since 1991 at the Anne Arundel County Historical Society's annual Strawberry Festival at Baltimore-Washington International Airport.

See also
 List of cakes
 List of regional dishes of the United States

References 

American cakes
Sponge cakes